Amitabh Bachchan is an Indian actor, occasional playback singer, film producer, television host and former politician who works in Hindi films. He made his acting debut in 1969 with Saat Hindustani, and narrated Mrinal Sen's Bhuvan Shome (1969). He later appeared as Dr. Bhaskar Banerjee in Hrishikesh Mukherjee's Anand (1971), for which he won the Filmfare Award for Best Supporting Actor. In 1973, Bachchan played the role of Inspector Vijay Khanna in Prakash Mehra's action film Zanjeer. He has since appeared in several films with the character name "Vijay". During the same year, he appeared in Abhimaan and Namak Haraam. For the latter, he received the Filmfare Award for Best Supporting Actor. Two years later he appeared along with Shashi Kapoor, in Yash Chopra's Deewaar, which earned him the Filmfare Award for Best Actor nomination. He was cited as the "angry young man" for his roles in Deewaar and Zanjeer. Later he starred in Ramesh Sippy's Sholay (1975), which is considered to be one of the greatest Indian films of all time. After appearing in the romantic drama Kabhie Kabhie (1976), Bachchan starred in Manmohan Desai's action comedy Amar Akbar Anthony (1977). He won the Filmfare Award for Best Actor for his performance in the latter. He then played dual roles of Don and Vijay in Don (1978), which again earned him the Filmfare Best Actor Award for the consecutive year.

In the 1980s, Bachchan was cast in numerous films, including the action films: Dostana (1980), Shaan (1980) and Kaalia (1981), the romantic film Silsila (1981); and the drama Shakti (1982) with Dilip Kumar. Bachchan's popularity continued to increase in the early 1980s, and his critically and commercially successful ventures in this period include Dostana (1980), Shaan (1980), Ram Balram (1980), Kranti (1981), Naseeb (1981), Lawaaris (1981), Anusandhan (1981), Kaalia (1981),Yaarana (1981), Satte Pe Satta (1982), Desh Premee (1982), Namak Halaal (1982), Khud-Daar (1982), Bemisal (1982), Shakti (1982), Andha Kanoon (1983), Mahaan (1983), and Coolie (1983). His performances in these films were critically acclaimed, and his performances in Dostana and Shakti earned him the nominations for the Filmfare Award for Best Actor. He suffered a near-fatal injury while shooting for Coolie (1983). His workload decreased for the upcoming four years (1984—1987), but he found critical and commercial success in Inquilaab (1984), Sharaabi (1984), Geraftaar (1985), Mard (1985) and Aakhree Raasta (1986).  He returned to the screen with the box-office success Shahenshah (1988). This was followed by critical and commercial failures, leading to a setback in his acting career. A year later, Bachchan played the role of gangster Vijay Deenanath Chauhan in Mukul S. Anand's Agneepath (1990) and later starred in Hum (1991), which was a commercial success. Despite being a box-office failure, the former garnered him the National Film Award for Best Actor and has since developed a cult status. He also earned the Filmfare Award for Best Actor for Hum, following which he took another break from acting. He then played Badshah Khan in Anand's 1992 drama Khuda Gawah, for which he received a civilian award from the President of Afghanistan. Khuda Gawah, released on 8 May 1992, was also a critical and commercial success, and Bachchan's performance was well received both domestically and internationally. In 1996, he started his film production company Amitabh Bachchan Corporation whose first release Tere Mere Sapne (1996) was a box-office hit.

In 2000, Bachchan appeared in a supporting role in Aditya Chopra's Mohabbatein. It won him the Filmfare Award for Best Supporting Actor. During the same year, he made his television debut as the host of the game show Kaun Banega Crorepati. He has since hosted its every season except for the third one. He then went on to play the roles of a short-tempered banker in Aankhen (2002), a disillusioned father in Baghban (2003), and a conflicted cop in Khakee (2004). In 2005, he played the role of a teacher of a blind and deaf girl in Sanjay Leela Bhansali's Black, for which he received the National Award and the Filmfare Award for Best Actor. He received another National Award for Best Actor for playing a progeria patient in R. Balki's Paa (2009). He also portrayed the title character of a friendly ghost in Bhoothnath (2008), and its sequel Bhoothnath Returns (2014);. and played a hypochondriac in the comedy-drama Piku (2015). It earned him his fourth National Film Award for Best Actor.

Bachchan has also narrated several films including Shatranj Ke Khilari (1977), Lagaan (2001), Parineeta (2005), Jodhaa Akbar (2008), Ra.One (2011), and Krrish 3 (2013). He has also performed as a playback singer for films like Laawaris (1981), Silsila, and Baghban.

Films

Acting roles

Producer roles

Television

Documentaries

Music videos

Footnotes

See also 
 Awards and nominations received by Amitabh Bachchan

References

External links 
 
 

Filmography
Indian filmographies
Male actor filmographies